Tommy James and the Shondells is an American rock band formed in Niles, Michigan, in 1964. They had two No. 1 singles in the U.S. – "Hanky Panky" (July 1966, their only RIAA Certified Gold record) and "Crimson and Clover" (February 1969) – and also charted twelve other top 40 hits, including five in the Hot 100's top ten: "I Think We're Alone Now", "Mirage", "Mony Mony", "Sweet Cherry Wine", and "Crystal Blue Persuasion".

History

Origins

The band The Echoes formed in 1959 in Niles, Michigan, then evolved into Tom and the Tornadoes, with 12-year-old Tommy James (then known as Tommy Jackson) as lead singer. While attending Niles High School in Niles, Michigan, the group released its first single, "Long Pony Tail", in 1962.

In 1964, James renamed the band the Shondells because the name "sounded good" and in honor of nearby Fort Wayne's own Troy Shondell, famous for his 1961 release "This Time." At this time, the band included Tommy James (vocals and guitar), Larry Coverdale (lead guitar), Larry Wright (bass), Craig Villeneuve (keyboards), and Jim Payne (drums). In February 1964, the band recorded the Jeff Barry–Ellie Greenwich song "Hanky Panky" (originally a B-side by the Raindrops). As James could often be found playing at Niles High School events, his popularity locally continued to grow. James' version of "Hanky Panky" sold respectably in Michigan, Indiana, and Illinois, but Snap Records, the label under which "Hanky Panky" was originally released, had no national distribution. The band toured the eastern Midwest, but no other market took to the song. The single failed to chart nationally, and the Shondells disbanded in 1965 after its members graduated from high school.

After first considering taking a job outside of music, James decided to form a new band, the Koachmen, with Shondells guitarist Larry Coverdale and members of a rival group called the Spinners (not the hit-making group from Detroit). The Koachmen played a circuit of clubs in the Midwest through the summer and fall of 1965, but returned to Niles in February 1966, after the gigs dried up, to plot their next move.

Hanky Panky

Meanwhile, in 1965, Pittsburgh dance promoter Bob Mack had unearthed the forgotten single "Hanky Panky", playing it at various dance parties, and radio stations there touted it as an "exclusive". Listener response encouraged regular play, and demand soared. Bootleggers responded by printing 80,000 black market copies of the recording, which were sold in Pennsylvania stores.

James first learned of all this activity in April 1966 after getting a telephone call from Pittsburgh disc jockey "Mad Mike" Metro(vich) asking him to come and perform the song. James attempted to contact other members of the Shondells, but they had all moved away, joined the service, or gotten married and left the music business altogether.  There remains disagreement over the role of Metrovich in the recording. In his book, Me, The Mob and the Music, James credits Pittsburgh dance promoter Bob Mack and never mentions Metrovich.

In April 1966, James went by himself to make promotional appearances in Pittsburgh in nightclubs and on local television. He recruited a quintet that was playing at the Thunderbird Lounge in Greensburg called the Raconteurs -- Joe Kessler (guitar), Ron Rosman (keyboards), George Magura (saxophone), Mike Vale (bass), and Johnnie Hogg (drums) – as the new Shondells. "I had no group, and I had to put one together really fast," recalled James. "I was in a Greensburg, PA club one night, and I walked up to a group that was playing that I thought was pretty good and asked them if they wanted to be the Shondells. They said yes, and off we went."

With a touring group to promote the single, James went to New York City, where he sold the master of "Hanky Panky" to Roulette Records, at which time he changed his last name to James. With national promotion, the single became a No. 1 hit in July 1966. He signed with Leonard Stogel and Associates for management. In 1967, Kessler and Hogg were forced to leave after a dispute when planned monies were not remitted to them by Roulette, a label closely associated with organized crime, and whose head, Morris Levy, was the inspiration for the Herman "Hesh" Rabkin character on The Sopranos. They were replaced by Eddie Gray (guitar) and Peter Lucia (drums); Magura departed as well.

Tommy James and the Shondells
At first, Tommy James and "his" Shondells played straightforward rock and roll, but they soon became associated with the budding bubblegum music genre. James disputes this, saying that Super K Productions "bubblegum" producers Jerry Kasenetz and Jeffry Katz approached his record company (run by Morris Levy) looking for songwriting jobs. Levy spurned Kasenetz and Katz, so they went elsewhere and became successful with such bands as the 1910 Fruitgum Company. Bubblegum is generally traced to the success of the 1968 Fruitgum Company hit "Simon Says". Tommy rejects the "bubblegum" label for his music. In early 1967 songwriter Ritchie Cordell gave them the No. 4 hit "I Think We're Alone Now" and the No. 10 hit "Mirage". In 1968, James had a No. 3 hit with "Mony Mony". Co-written by James, Cordell, Cordell's writing partner Bo Gentry, and Bobby Bloom, "Mony Mony" reached No. 3 in the US and was a British No. 1 in 1968. The title was inspired by a flashing sign for Mutual Of New York visible from James's apartment balcony in New York. He followed it with "Do Something to Me". However, James was labeled as a bubblegum pop artist, which he hated. Therefore, he changed his style to psychedelic rock.

The group toured with Vice President Hubert Humphrey during his 1968 presidential campaign, for which Humphrey showed his appreciation by writing the liner notes for their next album Crimson & Clover, which was released in Dec. 1968.  From late 1968, the group began writing their own songs, with James and Lucia penning the psychedelic-tinged classic "Crimson and Clover", which was recorded and mixed by Bruce Staple, with James tackling vocal duties and playing many of the instruments himself, and featured the creative use of studio effects such as delay and tremolo.

Further hits included "Sweet Cherry Wine", "Crystal Blue Persuasion", and "Ball of Fire", all from 1969. They also produced "Sugar on Sunday", later covered by the Clique. As the band embraced the sounds of psychedelia, they were invited to perform at Woodstock, but declined. 

The group continued until 1970.

Hog Heaven 
At a concert in Birmingham, Alabama in March of 1970, an exhausted James collapsed after coming off stage from a reaction to drugs and was pronounced dead. He was not dead, however, and decided to move to the country to rest and recuperate, and left the band. His four bandmates carried on for a short while under the name Hog Heaven, recording two albums (one "self-titled" on Roulette Records in March 1971 and the second recorded in 1971, but unreleased until 2008), and landing one Hot 100 hit, "Happy," at number 98, but disbanded soon afterwards.

In a 1970 side project, James wrote and produced the No. 7 hit single "Tighter, Tighter" for the group Alive N Kickin'. James launched a solo career in 1970 that yielded two notable hits over a 10-year span, "Draggin' the Line" (1971) and "Three Times in Love" (1980).

Covers by other artists
During the 1980s, the group's songbook produced major hits for three other artists: Joan Jett & The Blackhearts' version of "Crimson and Clover" (No. 7 in 1982), Tiffany's "I Think We're Alone Now" and Billy Idol's "Mony Mony" (back-to-back No. 1 singles in November 1987). Other Shondells covers have been performed by acts as disparate as psychobilly ravers the Cramps, new wave singer Lene Lovich, country music veteran Dolly Parton, and the Boston Pops orchestra.

1980s and later
In the mid-1980s, Tommy James began touring in oldies packages with other acts from the 1960s sometimes billed as Tommy James & the Shondells, although he is the group's only original member. A Greenwich Village nightclub appearance was filmed and released as Tommy James & the Shondells: Live! At The Bitter End. On January 6, 1987, original drummer Peter P. Lucia Jr. died of a heart attack while playing golf at the age of 39.

In 2008, "I'm Alive" was covered by Tom Jones and released on his "24 Hours" album.

In 2008, Tommy James and The Shondells were inducted into the Michigan Rock and Roll Legends Hall of Fame.

In 2009, James and the surviving Shondells, Gray, Vale and Rosman, reunited to record music for a soundtrack of a proposed film based on James' autobiography, Me, the Mob, and the Music, released in February 2010. The group still gets together from time to time for special video/TV events and nostalgia shows.

In March 2011, the Tommy James song "I'm Alive" (co-written with Peter Lucia) became a top 20 hit in the Netherlands for UK singer Don Fardon after his version had been used in a Vodafone commercial. The song originally appeared on the Crimson & Clover LP.

In 2012, "Crystal Blue Persuasion" was used in the eighth episode of Season 5 of Breaking Bad, "Gliding Over All", during a montage depicting the process involved to bring main character Walter White's methamphetamine operation and its signature blue crystal meth to an international level.

In 2015, Gray, Vale, and Rosman decided to reunite and form their new group, The Crystal Blue Band. They recruited their longtime friend and drummer Mike Wilps to replace the late Peter Lucia.  That group disbanded in 2022.

Recognition
In 2008, Tommy James and The Shondells were inducted into the Michigan Rock and Roll Legends Hall of Fame.

Discography

Studio albums

Compilation albums

Singles
Tom and the Tornadoes

The Shondells 

Tommy James and the Shondells

Hog Heaven

Further reading
 James, Tommy (with Martin Fitzpatrick), Me, the Mob, and the Music: One Helluva Ride with Tommy James and the Shondells, New York : Scribner, 2010.

References

External links
 Tommyjames.com — official site

1959 establishments in Michigan
American pop rock music groups
Bubblegum pop groups
Musical groups established in 1959
Psychedelic rock music groups from Michigan
Roulette Records artists